Manuel Blanco may refer to:
Francisco Manuel Blanco (1778–1845), Spanish botanist and friar
Manuel Blanco Encalada (1790–1876), Chilean President
Manuel Blanco Romasanta (1809–1863), Spanish serial killer
Manuel Blanco (footballer) (born 1983), Spanish footballer